Mary Virginia Lee Badgett (born 1960) is an American economist at the University of Massachusetts Amherst, best known for her research into economic issues relevant to lesbians, gay men, and their families.

Badgett earned a Bachelor of Arts degree in economics from the University of Chicago in 1982 and a Doctor of Philosophy degree in economics from the University of California, Berkeley, in 1990.  From 1990 to 1997 she was on the faculty at the University of Maryland, College Park, and in 1997 she joined the University of Massachusetts, Amherst.  Since 2005 Badgett has also been the research director at the UCLA Williams Institute.

Badgett's research has debunked the myth that gay and lesbian Americans are more affluent than straight people.  She has also documented the effects on taxation of government recognition of same-sex marriage, showing in 2007 that same-sex couples pay on average more than $1,000 annually than similarly situated opposite-sex couples whose marriage is recognized.  This research has been cited by numerous companies and institutions who have altered their employee compensation and benefits to try to remedy the disparity.   Badgett has testified as an expert witness before Congress and other legislatures, and in various litigations regarding same-sex marriage, including the Proposition 8 trial.

Bibliography
 When Gay People Get Married: What Happens When Societies Legalize Same-Sex Marriage (NYU Press, 2009)
 Co-Editor, Sexual Orientation Discrimination:  An International Perspective (Routledge, 2007)
 Money, Myths, and Change:  The Economic Lives of Lesbians and Gay Men (University of Chicago Press, 2001)

References

External links
 
 "Lee Badgett", Faculty Profile, Department of Economics, University of Massachusetts Amherst
 "Lee Badgett", Faculty Profile, Center for Research on Families, University of Massachusetts Amherst
 "Selected Works", University of Massachusetts Amherst ScholarWorks (institutional repository)

1960 births
Living people
21st-century American economists
University of Massachusetts Amherst faculty
University of Chicago alumni
UC Berkeley College of Letters and Science alumni
LGBT and the economy
American lesbian writers
Lesbian scientists
American LGBT rights activists
American LGBT scientists
American women non-fiction writers
American women academics
Labor economists
21st-century American women writers